Bughotu may be,

Bughotu language, Solomon Islands
Turbonilla bughotu, sp. sea snail